David Daly may refer to:

 David Daly (academic) (born 1940), American academic
 David Daly (cricketer) (1874–1944), South African cricketer
 David Daly (weightlifter) (born 1973), Irish weightlifter

See also
 David Dale (disambiguation)